Michael Schweizer (born 16 December 1983 in Aachen) is a German cyclist, who currently rides for German amateur team RC Zugvogel 09 Aachen. His brother Christoph Schweizer is also a cyclist.

Major results

2008
 2nd Road race, World University Road Championships
 9th Rund um Düren
2009
 1st Stage 2 Tour de Liège
 3rd Rund um Düren
2010
 2nd Rund um Düren
 2nd Kernen Omloop Echt-Susteren
 3rd Ronde van Midden-Nederland
 9th Omloop van het Waasland
2011
 3rd Ronde van Midden-Nederland
 5th Grand Prix of Moscow
 9th Mayor Cup
2012
 1st Rund um Düren
 1st Stage 2 Five Rings of Moscow
 5th Kernen Omloop Echt-Susteren
 6th Ronde van Midden-Nederland
 7th Garmin ProRace
 7th Ster van Zwolle
2013
 1st Stage 2 Course de la Solidarité Olympique
 3rd Ronde van Midden-Nederland
 6th Trofeo Alcide Degasperi
2014
 5th Overall Tour of Estonia
2015
 1st Overall Tour de Toowoomba
 1st Stage 3 Tour of the King Valley
 1st Stage 5 Tour of Tasmania
 1st Stage 2 Tour of Al Zubarah

References

External links

1983 births
Living people
German male cyclists
Cyclo-cross cyclists
Sportspeople from Aachen
Cyclists from North Rhine-Westphalia
21st-century German people